Bälinge IF is a sports club from Bälinge, 10 kilometres north-west of Uppsala, Sweden.

Background
Bälinge Idrottsförening was established on 15 March 1936 and is currently active in men's and ladies' football, cross-country skiing, floorball, and table tennis. In the past the club has also run an ice hockey section. In the first years of Bälinge IF's history their sportsmen wore blue and yellow team colours. It was then decided that these colours could only be used by a Swedish national team so BIF had to switch to black and yellow.

Since 1942 Bälinge IF has participated mainly in the middle and lower divisions of the Swedish football league system. The club currently plays in Division 4 Uppland which is the sixth tier of Swedish football. They play their home matches at the Bälinge IP in Bälinge.

The club is most famous for its women's football team which participated in the Women's Premier Division (Damallsvenskan) for thirteen seasons since it was established in 1978. The team has never won the Swedish championships but it contributed with players to the Swedish national team, among these Josefine Öqvist who participated in the 2004 Summer Olympics. The team now play at a much lower level: in Division 4 Uppland.

Bälinge IF women's football team played their home games at Studenternas IP Stadium in Uppsala, since the sports field in Bälinge was far too small to host premier games. The team colours are black and yellow.

Bälinge IF are affiliated to the Upplands Fotbollförbund.

Season to season

Men's team

Ladies' team

Attendances

Men's team

Ladies' team

Footnotes

External links
 Bälinge IF – Official website

Football clubs in Uppsala County
Women's football clubs in Sweden
Association football clubs established in 1936
1936 establishments in Sweden